ZOO was a J-pop band formed in 1989. They debuted with the single "Careless Dance" on 5 May 1990. They had one major hit with the song "Choo Choo TRAIN," released on 7 November 1991. JR East Railway used the song "YA-YA-YA" in their Ski-Ski campaign for the 1992-1993 ski season.  In 1993 British dance music duo Band of Gypsies and singer Miriam Stockley released an album of cover versions of ZOO songs called Song of ZOO Meets House Style. After disbanding in 1995, a former member, Hiroyuki Igarashi, made the band Luv Deluxe debut in 1996, but it was soon disbanded in 1997. In 1999, he formed the band J Soul Brothers, which was renamed Exile in 2001, which in turn re-made the song "Choo Choo Train" in 2003 and quickly became one of their biggest hits.

Members

Final line-up
 TACO (Senteru Nojima): leader of ZOO, dancer
 SATSUKI (Satsuki Goki): lead singer
 SAE (Saeko Ebisawa): dancer
 HIRO (Hiroyuki Igarashi): dancer, leader of EXILE
 CAP (Toshihiro Sakai):
 LUKE (Kenji Saitou): dancer
 MARK (Junhisa Okayama): dancer, now a member of Runningman Tokyo.
 NAOYA (Naoya Setani)

Former members
 HISAMI (Hisami Takemura): instructor, now a member of Runningman Tokyo.
 MAMI (Mami Murao)
 YU-KI (Yuuki Kitamura): singer, now a member of TRF.

Discography

Singles
 Careless Dance (5 May 1990)
 GIVEN (5 February 1991)
 NATIVE (3 July 1991)
 Choo Choo TRAIN (7 November 1991)
 Gorgeous (23 April 1992)
 YA-YA-YA (21 October 1992)
 SHY-SHY-SHINE (18 June 1993)
 Ding Dong Express (21 October 1993)
 On Time (21 April 1994)
 Angelic Dream (7 November 1994)
 Adam (1 March 1995)

Albums
 NATIVE (21 July 1991)
 Present Pleasure (15 December 1991)
 Gorgeous (13 May 1992)
 JUNGLE (16 December 1992)
 ZOO FOR SALE (21 May 1993)
 Can I Dance? (19 November 1993)
 PALAST (7 December 1994)
 ZOO LAST DANCE (16 December 1995)
 ZOO THE FINAL ~LAST DANCE LIVE~ (21 March 1996)

LUV DELUXE Albums
LUV DELUXE was a side-band formed in 1995 by CAP, SAE and HIRO. They split up in June 1997.

 どうなってんだ！ (Dou natten da! – What it has become!) (22 July 1996)
 トパーズの涙 (Topazu no Namida – Tears of Topaz) (10 October 1996)
 LUV DELUXE (22 January 1997)

Video Works
 ZOO ~Careless Dance~ (21 July 1990)
 ZOO II ~GIVEN~ (21 March 1991)
 ZOO+ZOO II (Laserdisc) (21 March 1991)
 ZOO III ~NATIVE~ (21 August 1991)
 ZOO IV ~Choo Choo TRAIN~ (15 December 1991)
 ZOO Night 1991 LIVE (21 March 1992) From their 25 December 1991 concert.
 ZOO V ~Gorgeous~ (17 July 1992)
 ZOO VI ~YA-YA-YA~ (21 January 1993)
 ZOO JAPAN TOUR '92 ~YA-YA-YA~ IN BUDOKAN (21 April 1993)
 ZOO VII ~Ding Dong Express~ (1 December 1993)
 ZOO JAPAN TOUR 1993 ~CAN I DANCE~  IN BUDOKAN (18 March 1994)
 ZOO THE BEST (21 July 1994)
 ZOO VIII ~Angelic Dream~ (16 December 1994)
 ZOO LAST DANCE (16 December 1995)
 ZOO THE FINAL ~LAST DANCE LIVE~ (21 March 1996)

Compilations
 Dance Paradise Hyper Euro ZOO (22 November 2000)
 ZOO REMIX 2000 (20 December 2000)
 PURE BEST (27 September 2001)
 ZOO GOLDEN BEST: Special Works (19 March 2003)

J-pop
Japanese pop music groups
Musical groups established in 1989